Recaredo is a village and rural municipality in Salta Province in northwestern Argentina.
It is near General Mosconi, Salta, and its population relies on local petroleum extraction.

References

Populated places in Salta Province